The following is a comprehensive list of awards received by American singer Nicky Jam. He received a total of 110 nominations and won 37 awards.

American Music Awards

Billboard Music Awards

Billboard Latin Music Awards
The Billboard Latin Music Awards grew out of the Billboard Music Awards program from Billboard magazine, an industry publication charting the sales and radio airplay success of musical recordings. The Billboard awards are the Latin music industry's longest running award. The award ceremonies are held during the same week of the BillboardLatin Music Conference. The first award ceremony began in 1994. In addition to awards given on the basis of success on the Billboard charts, the ceremony includes the Spirit of Hope award for humanitarian achievements and the Lifetime Achievement award, as well as awards by the broadcasting partner. Nicky Jam has received 38 Nominations and won 15 awards from them

Heat Latin Music Awards

iHeartRadio Music Awards

Latin American Music Awards 
The Latin American Music Awards (Latin AMAs) is an annual American music award that is presented by Telemundo. It is the Spanish-language counterpart of the American Music Awards (AMAs) produced by the Dick Clark Productions. As with AMAs, the Latin AMAs are determined by a poll of the public and music buyers. Nicky Jam has won 3 awards from 21 nominations.

Latin Grammy Awards

LOS40 Music Awards

Lunas del Auditorio

NRJ Music Awards

Premios Juventud

Premio Lo Nuestro

Premios Tu Mundo

Telemundo's Tu Musica Urban Awards

References

Jam, Nicky